Tapinocyboides is a genus of sheet weavers that was first described by H. Wiehle in 1960.  it contains only two species, both found in Europe and India: T. bengalensis and T. pygmaeus.

See also
 List of Linyphiidae species (Q–Z)

References

Araneomorphae genera
Linyphiidae
Palearctic spiders
Spiders of the Indian subcontinent